Ku Kuo-Chian (born 10 November 1968) is a Taiwanese baseball player who competed in the 1992 Summer Olympics.

He was part of the Chinese Taipei baseball team which won the silver medal. He played as infielder.

External links
profile

1968 births
Living people
Asian Games competitors for Chinese Taipei
Baseball players at the 1990 Asian Games
Baseball players at the 1992 Summer Olympics
Baseball shortstops
China Times Eagles players
Medalists at the 1992 Summer Olympics
Olympic baseball players of Taiwan
Olympic medalists in baseball
Olympic silver medalists for Taiwan
People from Pingtung County
Taiwanese baseball players
20th-century Taiwanese people